Castle Brands is a developer and international marketer of premium and super premium beverage alcohol brands. Its core spirits include rum, whiskey/bourbon, liqueurs, and vodka, which are marketed and sold in the United States, Canada, Europe, Latin America and Asia.

About
In 1998, Castle Brands Inc. was founded by Mark Andrews. The company has built its portfolio with both wide market and niche liquor products, including Jefferson's Presidential Collection whiskies.

It distributes its products in all 50 states in the United States and the District of Columbia, in thirteen primary international markets, including Ireland, Great Britain, Northern Ireland, Germany, Canada, South Africa, Bulgaria, France, Russia, Finland, Norway, Sweden, China and the Duty Free markets, and in a number of other countries in continental Europe, Asia and Latin America.

History
The company was founded in 1998 by Mark Andrews under the name Great Spirits LLC, through Mr. Andrews’ contribution of family-owned Knappogue Castle Irish Whiskey. Castle Brands Inc, was later established in 2003 and Great Spirits LLC was merged into Castle Brands. Between 2003 and 2006, Castle Brands acquired Roaring Water Bay Spirits, later acquired McLain & Kyne, established Gosling-Castle Partners and signed a distribution agreement with Pallini SpA. These four deals expanded the portfolio with Jefferson’s Bourbon, Boru Vodka, Clontarf Irish Whiskey, and Brady’s Irish Cream Liqueur and provided exclusive distribution rights to Gosling’s rums and Pallini Limoncello.

Castle completed its IPO in April 2006, at $9.00 per share, and raised net $29.3 million on 3.5 million shares. Proceeds were used to fund product expansion with the October 2006 acquisition of McLain & Kyne as well as an increase in sales and marketing efforts. Additional private financing in later years allowed the company to add more product lines.

Since 2014, the company management focused on growing its current brands across four categories: rum, whiskey/bourbon, liqueurs and vodka.

In October 2019, the company was purchased by the French group Pernod Ricard, second worldwide producer of wines and spirits.

Brands
Castle Brands’ current portfolio contains the following brands:

Gosling’s Rum and Stormy Ginger Beer
Jefferson’s Bourbons and Rye
Pallini Liqueurs
Knappogue Castle Single Malt Irish Whiskies
Clontarf 1014 Irish Whiskey
Brady's Irish Cream
Celtic Honey Liqueur
Gozio Amaretto
 Boru Vodka
 Castello Mio Sambuca
 Tierras Tequila

References 

Companies listed on NYSE American
American distilled drinks
Alcoholic drink companies
Drink companies of the United States
Food and drink companies based in New York City